The 2014 Allsvenskan, part of the 2014 Swedish football season, was the 90th season of Allsvenskan since its establishment in 1924. The 2014 fixtures were released on 20 December 2013. The season started on 30 March 2014 and concluded on 1 November 2014. Malmö FF were the defending champions from the 2013 season.

Malmö FF won the Swedish championship this season, their 21st Allsvenskan title and 18th Swedish championship overall, in the 27th round on 5 October 2014 when they won 3–2 in the away fixture against AIK at Friends Arena. Malmö FF became the first club to defend a Swedish championship by winning consecutive Allsvenskan titles since Djurgårdens IF in the 2003 season.

A total of 16 teams contested the league; 14 returning from the 2013 season and two that were promoted from Superettan.

Summary

Background
The annual pre-season kick-off meeting was held at Swedbank Stadion in Malmö on 25 March 2014. Managers and key players from the major teams as well as some of the predicted bottom teams were interviewed by representatives from the media as well as commentators from C More Entertainment, the official broadcasters of the league. Seven managers out of 16 believed that Malmö FF would defend the title. The remaining managers placed their bets on AIK (six votes), IF Elfsborg (two votes) and IFK Göteborg (one vote). The entire attendance consisted of the clubs' managers, key players and media experts. The attendance voted Malmö FF as the title favourites (41.9% of the votes) with AIK (38% of the votes) closely after, IFK Göteborg came in third with 6,7% of the votes. The attendance also predicted that Falkenbergs FF (38.3% of the votes) and Gefle IF (25.4% of the votes) were the two favourites to be relegated. When asked about the top goalscorer, a plurality of the audience voted for Malmö FF's Magnus Eriksson.

Season overview
The season started on 30 March 2014 with five fixtures. The most prominent match of the first round was the fixture between last year's runner-up AIK and last year's third placed team IFK Göteborg at Friends Arena on 31 March 2014, the match ended with a 2–0 win for IFK Göteborg. The reigning league champions Malmö FF started the season a day earlier with a home fixture at Swedbank Stadion against newcomers and first time Allsvenskan participants Falkenbergs FF, Malmö FF won the match 3–0 after a late surge. The first week of matches were deeply affected by the death of a Djurgårdens IF supporter prior to the match between Helsingborgs IF and Djurgården on 30 March 2014. A moment of silence were held at all venues for matches in the first round that were played after the event; players also wore mourning-bands to display their sympathy.

The season started out in a strong fashion for reigning champions Malmö who won the first four matches and drew in the fifth, not conceding a goal until the fourth match. In the process they defeated fellow title favourite Göteborg in the second week of matches at Gamla Ullevi. The first five weeks of matches saw Malmö top the table ahead of fellow title favourite Elfsborg while Göteborg and AIK positioned themselves 6th and 10th respectively. 2012 runners-up BK Häcken and last year's fourth placed team Kalmar FF chased Malmö and Elfsborg in the top of the table. In the lower part of the table Mjällby AIF and IF Brommapojkarna were positioned 16th and 15th respectively while newcomers and relegation favourites Falkenberg took 14th place. Gefle IF, the other team that were voted as one of the teams to be relegated found themselves in 11th place after five weeks of matches.

Seven more rounds of league matches were played before a months break for the 2014 FIFA World Cup. Two players from the league participated in the tournament, AIK's Celso Borges for Costa Rica and Malmö FF's Miiko Albornoz for Chile. The matches leading up to the break saw Malmö continuing to hold pole position in front of title challengers Elfsborg and Kalmar who were placed second and third respectively after twelve rounds. Both Malmö and Kalmar played several matches before losing, Malmö lost their first fixture in the seventh round at home against Häcken while Kalmar didn't lose a match until the tenth round in an away fixture, also against Häcken. In the last round of matches before the World Cup Malmö defeated Elfsborg at Borås Arena to create a six-point table gap to Elfsborg and Kalmar respectively. AIK recovered from their start of the season as they found themselves in fourth place before the break while the other favourites Göteborg remained in sixth place. IF Brommapojkarna had dropped down to last place in the table while Halmstads BK joined them in 15th place. Gefle positioned themselves in 14th place after the 12th week of matches while Mjällby proceeded upwards in the table, now arriving in safe territory in 13th place. Relegation favourites and newcomers alike Falkenberg took up 12th place after as many matches.

After twenty rounds of play, Malmö FF were clearly ahead of the other title contenders. Following a long win-less streak, Brommapojkarna seemed set to finish last as they were nine points behind Mjällby in 15th place. The toughest blow around this time for Brommapojkarna happened off the field; captain Pontus Segerström was diagnosed with a brain tumor. Segerström started undergoing treatment immediately. On 13 October Segerström died due to effects of the brain tumor. In the rounds to come it became clear that AIK and Elfsborg were Malmö FF's strongest contenders for the title. After the World Cup break Kalmar had started to fall in the table and were positioned 6th after 20 rounds. IFK Göteborg reached fourth place in the table after 22 rounds, having spent most of the season mid-table. A noteworthy event occurred on 19 August when Malmö FF celebrated a full consecutive year at the top of the Allsvenskan table.

In the 25th round Brommapojkarnas relegation to Superettan was confirmed as they lost 3–1 away to Helsingborg. In the same round Falkenberg was positioned 15th and was the closest team to join Brommapojkarna to the second tier of Swedish football. The other teams involved in the relegation battle was IFK Norrköping, Gefle and Mjällby, all teams separated by merely five points. At the other end of the table Malmö FF had an eight-point advantage to Elfsborg in second place with only five matches left to play. IFK Göteborg and AIK trailed Elfsborg with one point. Even though Malmö FF failed to win in three consecutive matches for the first time in more than a year, AIK and Elfsborg failed to take advantage. IFK Göteborg continued a strong streak and passed both AIK and Elfsborg to reach second place in the table for the first time this season. In the 27th round both Elfsborg and IFK Göteborg lost their early matches, providing Malmö FF with an opportunity to secure the title with at least one point at Friends Arena against AIK. Malmö FF ended up winning the match 3–2 and became Swedish champions for the second consecutive season, becoming the first Swedish club in eleven years to achieve this. The attention at the top of the table turned towards the two European berths beneath Malmö FF with IFK Göteborg, Elfsborg, AIK and Häcken competing with just four points between each other. At the bottom of the table Mjällby lost an important home fixture against already relegated Brommapojkarna while Norrköping and Falkenberg won their matches, sending Mjällby to 15th place with just three matches left to play. However the relegation battle was still very much alive as Gefle, Falkenberg and Norrköping were only one point ahead of Mjällby.

On October 29, Elfsborg manager Klas Ingesson died after battling cancer for several years. As a player, he represented IFK Göteborg and the Swedish national team on many occasions, and Ingesson had served as manager of IF Elfsborg since September 2013. Norrköping and Falkenberg gained some ground in the relegation battle after winning their games in the 28th round, IFK Norrköping against fellow relegation contenders Gefle and Falkenberg against Helsingborg. Meanwhile, Mjällby lost their match in the same round. In the 29th round Norrköping secured their Allsvenskan spot by winning at home against Örebro 2–0 while Falkenberg lost the Halland derby against Halmstad 4–0 on the road. With both Mjällby and Gefle also losing their games in the 29th round, Mjällby needed to beat Falkenberg in the away game in the last round to ensure survival by making it to the relegation play–offs. Falkenberg needed one point to be sure to avoid the relegation play-offs altogether while Gefle needed to take more points than Mjällby to avoid direct relegation. In the last round Gefle beat Helsingborg at home 2–1 while Falkenberg and Mjällby drew 1–1. This meant that Mjällby finished in 15th place and were relegated together with Brommapojkarna while Gefle finished in 14th place and qualified for the relegation play-offs against third place 2014 Superettan team Ljungskile SK.

IFK Göteborg finished as league runners-up after winning their remaining three matches in the race for the two qualifying spots for the 2015–16 UEFA Europa League, AIK grasped the last spot by finishing ahead of Elfsborg on goal difference. Brommapojkarna hosted Elfsborg in an emotional last game of the season as both clubs had lost team members to cancer during the last month of the season. Newly promoted Örebro SK proved to be one of the big surprises of the season as they finished in 6th place. The other promoted Superettan team and first time Allsvenskan contenders Falkenberg finished in 13th placed and managed to stay in the league. IFK Göteborg's Lasse Vibe became the league top scorer with 23 goals during the season while Markus Rosenberg of Malmö FF made the most assists with 14. Both Rosenberg and Vibe also amounted to the most points with 29. The favourite to become top scorer Magnus Eriksson of Malmö FF scored five goals.

Allsvenskans stora pris
For the second year running, the broadcaster of Allsvenskan, C More Entertainment, hosted an award ceremony where they presented seven awards and two special awards to the players and staff of the 16 Allsvenskan clubs, the award ceremony was held on 6 November 2014. The nominations for the 2014 season were officially announced on 3 November 2014. Nominees are displayed below, the winners are marked in bold text. Malmö FF received the most nominations with eight nominations while IFK Göteborg received four nominations and AIK, Helsingborgs IF and IF Elfsborg received two nominations. Djurgårdens IF, Falkenbergs FF and Örebro SK received one nomination each. Notably none of the players and managers from last years season awards were nominated.

Goalkeeper of the year
Robin Olsen (Malmö FF)
Kenneth Høie (Djurgårdens IF)
Kevin Stuhr Ellegaard (IF Elfsborg)

Defender of the year
Johan Larsson (IF Elfsborg)
Filip Helander (Malmö FF)
Erik Johansson (Malmö FF)

Midfielder of the year
Emil Forsberg (Malmö FF)
Nabil Bahoui (AIK)
Markus Halsti (Malmö FF)

Forward of the year
Markus Rosenberg (Malmö FF)
Lasse Vibe (IFK Göteborg)
David Accam (Helsingborgs IF)

Newcomer of the year
Gustav Engvall (IFK Göteborg)
Ludwig Augustinsson (IFK Göteborg)
Patrik Carlgren (AIK)

Manager of the year
Åge Hareide (Malmö FF)
Henrik Larsson (Falkenbergs FF)
Alexander Axén (Örebro SK)

Most valuable player of the year
Markus Rosenberg (Malmö FF)
Lasse Vibe (IFK Göteborg)
David Accam (Helsingborgs IF)

Suspended matches
The 2014 Allsvenskan season encountered serious incidents involving pyrotechnical items and supporter violence, with one match needing to be suspended.

Helsingborgs IF vs. Djurgårdens IF
The season-opening match at Olympia between Helsingborgs IF and Djurgårdens IF on 30 March 2014 was abandoned after 42 minutes of play, with the score at that time being 1–1. Djurgården fans invaded the pitch after reports that a Djurgården fan had died from injuries sustained in an assault outside the arena before the beginning of the match. The assault occurred at the Kärnan medieval tower. The death of the 43-year-old man was confirmed by the Skåne police. This was the first football-related death in Sweden since 2002, when IFK Göteborg supporter Tony Deogan was killed in Stockholm in a clash with AIK supporters. Another four people also sustained injuries in connection to the match. The decision was made to abandon the match. On 14 April 2014, the Swedish Football Association's (SFA) disciplinary committee decided that the match would not continue and that it would end with the score 1–1. According to the committee, the decision was taken in respect of the man killed.

Two days after the death, a 28-year-old man from Helsingborg was arrested. On 16 June 2014, the Helsingborg District Court sentenced him to eight months in prison for assault and involuntary manslaughter.

Teams
A total of sixteen teams contested the league, including fourteen sides from the 2013 season and two promoted teams from the 2013 Superettan. Two of the three promoted teams for the 2013 season managed to stay in the league, IF Brommapojkarna and Halmstads BK.

Östers IF and Syrianska FC were relegated at the end of the 2013 season after finishing in the bottom two places of the table. They were replaced by 2013 Superettan champions Falkenbergs FF and runners-up Örebro SK. Falkenberg participated in the league for the first time in the club's history, they were the first new club in Allsvenskan's history since Syrianska FC in 2011. Örebro returned to Allsvenskan after one-year absence, having been relegated at the end of the 2012 season. This was Örebro's 46th season in the league.

Halmstads BK as 14th-placed team retained their Allsvenskan spot after winning against third-placed Superettan team GIF Sundsvall 3–2 on aggregate in a relegation/promotion playoff. This was notably a replay of the 2012 play-off where Sundsvall lost their Allsvenskan spot to Halmstad.

Stadia and locations

 1 According to each club information page at the Swedish Football Association website for Allsvenskan.

Personnel and kits

Note: Flags indicate national team as has been defined under FIFA eligibility rules. Players and Managers may hold more than one non-FIFA nationality.

 1 According to each club information page at the Swedish Football Association website for Allsvenskan.

Managerial changes

League table

Positions by round

Note: Some matches were played out of phase with the corresponding round, positions were corrected in hindsight.

Results

Relegation play-offs

Gefle IF won 4–1 on aggregate.

Season statistics

Top scorers

Top assists

Top goalkeepers
(Minimum of 10 games played)

Hat-tricks

Scoring
First goal of the season: Aleksandar Prijović for Djurgårdens IF against Helsingborgs IF (30 March 2014)
Largest winning margin: 5 goals
IFK Göteborg 5–0 Åtvidabergs FF (17 April 2014)
Highest scoring game: 8 goals
IFK Göteborg IF 6–2 Helsingborgs IF (6 July 2014)
IFK Norrköping 3–5 Djurgårdens IF (14 July 2014)
Most goals scored in a match by a single team: 6 goals
IFK Göteborg IF 6–2 Helsingborgs IF (6 July 2014)
Most goals scored in a match by a losing team: 3 goals
IFK Norrköping 3–5 Djurgårdens IF (14 July 2014)
Örebro SK 3–4 IFK Göteborg (24 September 2014)
Fewest games failed to score in: 2
Malmö FF
Most games failed to score in: 11
IF Brommapojkarna

Clean sheets
Most clean sheets: 13
IF Elfsborg
Fewest clean sheets: 2
IF Brommapojkarna

Discipline
Worst overall disciplinary record (1 pt per yellow card, 3 pts per red card): 57
Mjällby AIF (51 yellow cards, 2 red cards)
Best overall disciplinary record: 27
Gefle IF (27 yellow cards)
Most yellow cards (club): 51
Mjällby AIF
Most yellow cards (player): 8
Markus Rosenberg (Malmö FF)
Ibrahim Moro (AIK)
Patrik Haginge (Örebro SK)
Most red cards (club):  4
Kalmar FF
Most red cards (player): 2
Kjetil Wæhler (IFK Göteborg)
Alexander Faltsetas (Djurgårdens IF)
Joseph Baffo (Halmstads BK)
Jacob Une Larsson (IF Brommapojkarna)
Most fouls (player): 54
Gustav Sandberg Magnusson (IF Brommapojkarna)

Attendance

See also 

Competitions
 2014 Superettan
 2014 Division 1
 2013–14 Svenska Cupen

Team seasons
 2014 AIK season
 2014 BK Häcken season
 2014 Djurgårdens IF season
 2014 IFK Göteborg season
 2014 Malmö FF season

Transfers
 List of Swedish football transfers winter 2013–14

References

External links 

  

Allsvenskan seasons
Swed
Swed
1